Parkham is a village in Devon, England.

Parkham may also refer to:

 Parkham, Tasmania, a locality in Tasmania, Australia
 Parkham, Uttar-Pradesh, a village in Uttar Pradesh, India